The Sighişoara gas field natural gas field in Sighişoara, Mureș County. It was discovered in 2003 and developed by Romgaz and Wintershall. It began production in 2004 and produces natural gas and condensates. The total proven reserves of the Sighişoara gas field are around 196 billion cubic feet (5 km³), and production is slated to be around 10.6 million cubic feet/day (0.3×105m³) in 2004.

References

Natural gas fields in Romania